Torgeir Herje Bergrem (born 20 September 1991 in Trondheim or Harstad) is a Norwegian snowboarder. He competed in slopestyle event at the 2014 Winter Olympics in Sochi and also in the slopestyle event at the 2018 Winter Olympics.

References

External links
 
 
 
 
 

1991 births
Living people
People from Harstad
Snowboarders at the 2014 Winter Olympics
Snowboarders at the 2018 Winter Olympics
Olympic snowboarders of Norway
Norwegian male snowboarders
Sportspeople from Troms og Finnmark
21st-century Norwegian people